Cleckheaton Spen railway station served the town of Cleckheaton, West Yorkshire, England, from 1900 to 1953 on the Leeds New Line.

History 
The station was opened as Cleckheaton on 1 October 1900 by the London and North Western Railway. It had a large goods yard with a cattle dock and a warehouse. Access was controlled by two signal boxes. The station's name was changed to Cleckheaton Spen on 2 June 1924. It closed on 5 January 1953, except for occasional excursions. Nothing remains.

References

External links 

Disused railway stations in West Yorkshire
Former London and North Western Railway stations
Railway stations in Great Britain opened in 1900
Railway stations in Great Britain closed in 1953
1900 establishments in England
1953 disestablishments in England